Scott Alan Fulhage (born November 17, 1961) is a former National Football League punter who played for the Cincinnati Bengals from 1987 to 1988 and the Atlanta Falcons from 1989 to 1992.

College career
Scott played college football at Kansas State University and is one of four players to be the starting punter four years straight.

Professional career
Scott Fulhage went undrafted in 1987 after a very successful college career and was signed in the off season by the Cincinnati Bengals. Fulhage was part of the 1988 Cincinnati Bengals team that made a run to Super Bowl XXIII, where the Bengals fell to the San Francisco 49ers 20-16. In the Super Bowl, Fulhage punted 5 times for 221 yards. Fulhage was considered one of the most consistent punters in 1989, leading the NFC with 24 punts inside the opponents' 20-yard line, and finishing third in the NFL with 84 attempts. In 6 years of playing in the NFL, Fulhage successfully completed one fake punt against the San Francisco 49ers, a 12-yard pass for a successful first down, in the 1989 season during his time with the Atlanta Falcons. Fulhage is also credited with two rushing attempts, during the 1989 and 1992 seasons, but gained a total of 0 yards. Although he started with a slow career he picked up the pace.  The remainder of his statistics show consistency and a solid history as a punter, with only one fumble in those six years.  He played in 88 games, punted 399 times for a total of 16,513 yards (averaging just over 41 yards per punt) with a long of 65 yards.

References

1961 births
Living people
People from Beloit, Kansas
Players of American football from Kansas
American football punters
Kansas State Wildcats football players
Cincinnati Bengals players
Atlanta Falcons players
National Football League replacement players